The Tilted Screen is a 1966 British television play in the Armchair Theatre anthology series produced by ABC Weekend TV for the ITV network written by Noel Robinson) and directed by Bill Bain, both Australian as were the actors. The plot concerns an Australian man who marries a Japanese woman.

Cast
Fredric Abbott as Morrie
Yoko Tani as Michiko
Brian Anderson as Billo
Georgie Sterling
Reg Lye
Terence Donovan

References

External links
The Tilted Screen

1966 television plays
Armchair Theatre
Television shows produced by ABC Weekend TV